The John Deere PowerShift transmission was an eight-speed semi-automatic transmission without a torque converter, used in John Deere  tractors, including the iconic John Deere Model 4020. The Powershift is not to be confused with similar John Deere transmissions (including the Quad-Range and the  PowrQuad), or with the Ford Ultra Command Powershift or the Allis Chalmers Power Director.

References

John Deere